Norrlandsgatan is a street at Norrmalm, Stockholm. The street stretches from Birger Jarlsgatan to Hamngatan. The restaurant Fontainebleau was located at Norrlandsgatan until it was destroyed in a bombing on 31 December 1982.

References

Streets in Stockholm